Thomas (I) Szécsényi (died 1354) was a Hungarian powerful baron and soldier, who rose to prominence during King Charles I's war against the oligarchs. He belonged to the so-called "new aristocracy", who supported the king's efforts to restore royal power in the first decades of the 14th century. He was the first member of the influential Szécsényi family.

Career
The son of Farkas from the gens Kacsics, he joined King Charles I against the powerful Matthew III Csák in 1301; therefore, his relatives who followed Csák occupied his inherited possessions in Nógrád County. He fought at the Battle of Rozgony (15 June 1312) when the king's armies defeated the allied troops of Matthew Csák and Amadeus Aba's sons.

Shortly afterwards, the king granted Thomas the possession of Hollókő that had been confiscated from his relatives. In 1316, he occupied the Visegrád Castle from Máté Csák. He became the head (ispán) of Arad, Bács and Syrmia counties (1318) and the Judge of the Cumans (1319). In 1320, he was appointed to the Master of the Queen's Treasury (királynéi tárnokmester). Between 1318 and 1334, he married one of Queen Elisabeth's relatives, Anna of Oświęcim as his second wife. Following Matthew Csák's death (1321), the king granted him several castles and possessions in Heves, Gömör and Nógrád counties; thus, he received Ajnácskő (today Hajnáčka in Slovakia), Baglyaskő, Bene, Somoskő (today Šomoška in Slovakia) and Sztrahora Castles. In the same year, he became the Voivode of Transylvania. He suppressed the rebellion of the Transylvanian Saxons (1324) and the king granted him Salgó  Castle (today Sibiel in Romania). In 1342, he was appointed to the office of Master of the treasury  (tárnokmester) and in 1349, he became Judge royal (országbíró).

References

Sources

 
 
 
 
 
 
 
 
 
 
 
 

|-

|-

|-

|-

|-

1354 deaths
13th-century Hungarian people
14th-century Hungarian people
Judges royal
Voivodes of Transylvania
Masters of the treasury (Kingdom of Hungary)
Medieval Hungarian military leaders
Thomas